Chandra Pal Shailani  is an Indian politician. He is a follower of B. R. Ambedkar, and member of the Republican Party of India. He was elected to the Lok Sabha, the lower house of the Parliament of India from Hathras, Uttar Pradesh.

References

External links
Official biographical sketch in Parliament of India website

1940 births
Janata Party (Secular) politicians
Indian National Congress politicians
Republican Party of India politicians
Lok Sabha members from Uttar Pradesh
India MPs 1971–1977
India MPs 1980–1984
Living people